Joël Santoni (5 November 1943 – 18 April 2018) was a French film director and screenwriter. He directed the 1976 film Scrambled Eggs, which starred Jean Carmet and Anna Karina.

Selected filmography
  (1974), documentary on Belgian cyclist Eddy Merckx; soundtrack with music by David Munrow released as Renaissance Suite in 1974
 Scrambled Eggs (1976)
 Maintenant et pour toujours (1998), TV film

References

External links
 

1943 births
2018 deaths
French film directors
French male screenwriters
French screenwriters
People from Fez, Morocco